William Aubrey Hill (27 April 1910 – 11 August 1995) was a Welsh cricketer who played for Warwickshire and was active from 1929 to 1948. He was born in Carmarthen and died in Blackpool. He appeared in 169 first-class matches as a righthanded batsman who bowled right arm medium pace. He scored 6,423 runs with a highest score of 147 not out among six centuries and took one wickets with a best performance of one for 4.

Notes

1910 births
1995 deaths
Welsh cricketers
Warwickshire cricketers